Emma Lauwers (born 1 October 1993), known as Lea Rue, is a Belgian singer-songwriter.

Life and career 
Lauwers began her singing career on The Voice van Vlaanderen, where she was coached by Axelle Red. In 2015 her track "I Can't Say No!" reached number 2 on the Ultratop Belgian Singles Chart and number 14 on VG-lista in Norway.

Discography

Singles

*Did not appear in the official Belgian Ultratop 50 charts, but rather in the bubbling under Ultratip charts

References 

Belgian pop singers
1993 births
English-language singers from Belgium
Flemish musicians
Living people
21st-century Belgian women singers
21st-century Belgian singers